Ekrem Bardha (born 13 May 1933) is an Albanian American businessman, co-founder of the National Albanian American Council (NAAC), and former owner of Illyria Newspaper. He is currently serving as Albania's Honorary Consul in Michigan and is regarded as one of the most successful Albanians in America.

Early life
Bardha was born in the southern village of Radanj in Kolonjë District, Albania. Having escaped from the strict Albanian communist regime in 1953, after one of his brothers was jailed for political reasons, he settled in Detroit and went into the restaurant business. He eventually became the owner of 18 McDonald's fast-food franchises, which grossed over $25 million a year.

References 

   5. https://exit.al/en/2022/04/01/to-this-british-albanian-success-story-hats-off-to-you-all/ 

1933 births
Living people
Albanian emigrants to the United States
Albanian businesspeople
People from Kolonjë